Unaysaurus is a genus of unaysaurid sauropodomorph herbivore dinosaur. Discovered in southern Brazil, in the geopark of Paleorrota, in 1998, and announced in a press conference on Thursday, December 3, 2004, it is one of the oldest dinosaurs known. It is closely related to plateosaurid dinosaurs found in Germany, which indicates that it was relatively easy for species to spread across the giant landmass of the time, the supercontinent of Pangaea.

The fossils of Unaysaurus are well preserved. They consist of an almost complete skull, complete with a lower jaw, and partial skeleton with many of the bones still connected to each other in their natural positions. It is one of the most complete dinosaur skeletons (including complete skull) ever recovered in Brazil.

Discovery and naming 

Unaysaurus was found in the southern Brazilian state of Rio Grande do Sul, near the city of Santa Maria. It was recovered from the red beds of the Caturrita Formation, which is the geologic formation where similarly old dinosaurs like Saturnalia have been found. The oldest dinosaurs in the world are from here and nearby in Argentina (like the Eoraptor), which suggests that the first dinosaurs may have originated in the area.

The new species and genus were officially described by Luciano A. Leal, Sergio A. K. Azevodo, Alexander W. A. Kellner, and Átila A. S. da Rosa in the October 18, 2004 issue of the scientific journal Zootaxa. The name Unaysaurus comes from the word  (u-na-hee), meaning "black water" in the local Tupi language, which in turn refers to Agua Negra (also "black water"), the Portuguese name for the region where the fossils were found. The species epithet tolentinoi is named after Tolentino Marafiga, who discovered the fossils by the side of a road in 1998.

Description

Like most early dinosaurs, Unaysaurus was relatively small, and walked on two legs.

Classification 
Upon its description, Unaysaurus was assigned to the Plateosauridae. Under this assignment, the closest relative of Unaysaurus was, counter intuitively, not from South America, but rather Plateosaurus, which lived about 210 million years ago in Germany. However, in 2018, Unaysaurus was found to belong to the newly erected clade Unaysauridae, alongside Macrocollum and Jaklapallisaurus, the former of which was from Brazil.

Paleoecology 

Unaysaurus lived between about 225 to 200 million years ago, in the Carnian or Norian age of the late Triassic period. It was found in the south of Brazil, which at the time was connected to northwest Africa. The whole world was united into the great supercontinent of Pangaea, which was just starting to divide into Laurasia in the north, and Gondwana in the south. A U-Pb (Uranium decay) dating found that the Caturrita Formation dated around 225.42 million years ago, putting it less than 10 million years younger than the Santa Maria and Ischigualasto Formations, from where the earliest dinosaurs are known.

The Caturrita Formation has uncovered a wide variety of fauna, although the formation is also referred to as the upper portion of the Santa Maria 2 Sequence. Multiple dinosauriforms are represented in the rock of the formation, including the silesaur Sacisaurus agudoensis, and the coeval sauropodomorph Guaibasaurus candelariensis, all of which are not found anywhere else. The 
dicynodont Jachaleria candelariensis, an unclassified phytosaur, and isolated teeth of archosaur origin can also be unearthed in the formation. A single stereospondyl amphibian is known from the formation, but has not yet been identified specifically.

An extremely rich amount of small tetrapods have been recovered from the Caturrita Formation, which is quite surprising. Species preserved are the procolophonid Soturnia caliodon, the lepidosaur Cargninia enigmatica, the sphenodontid Clevosaurus brasiliensis, and some small therapsids coexisting with Faxinalipterus minima, a putative pterosaur. The therapsids include Riograndia guaibensis, Brasilodon quadrangularis, and Irajatherium hernandezi .

References

External links 

 
 
 
Dinosaurs of Rio grande do Sul.

Sauropodomorphs
Dinosaur genera
Late Triassic dinosaurs of South America
Fossils of Brazil
Paleontology in Rio Grande do Sul
Triassic Brazil
Taxa named by Alexander Kellner
Fossil taxa described in 2004